Public Cowboy #1 is a studio recording released on CD by the Western band Riders in the Sky on October 22, 1996.

Critical reception
According to AllMusic's Bruce Eder, the Riders in the Sky created this album in the wake of performing a Gene Autry medley on television with Autry himself in the audience.

In another review, James H. Nottage wrote:

Track listing
 "Back in the Saddle Again" (Gene Autry, Ray Whitley) – 3:58
 "Sioux City Sue" (Ray Freedman, Dick Thomas) – 2:39
 "Mexicali Rose" (Helen Stone, Jack Tenney) – 2:48
 "You Are My Sunshine" (Jimmie Davis, Charles Mitchell) – 3:24
 "Have I Told You Lately That I Love You?" (Scott Wiseman) – 3:39
 "Can't Shake the Sands of Texas from My Shoes" (Autry, Johnston, Pitts) – 2:55
 "That Silver Haired Daddy of Mine" (Autry, Jimmy Long) – 3:50
 "Be Honest with Me" (Autry, Fred Rose) – 2:20
 "Blue Canadian Rockies" (Autry, Cindy Walker) – 2:45
 "Lonely River" (Autry, Fred Rose, Ray Whitley) – 3:02
 "South of the Border" (Michael Carr, Jimmy Kennedy) – 3:13
 "Ridin' Down the Canyon" (Autry, Smiley Burnette) – 4:16

Personnel
 Douglas B. Green (a.k.a. Ranger Doug) – vocals, guitar
 Paul Chrisman (a.k.a. Woody Paul) – vocals, fiddle
 Fred LaBour (a.k.a. Too Slim) – vocals, bass

References

External links
 Riders in the Sky (official website)

1996 albums
Riders in the Sky (band) albums
Rounder Records albums